The 2023 West Coast Conference men's basketball Tournament was the postseason men's basketball tournament for the West Coast Conference for the 2022–23 season. All tournament games were played at Orleans Arena in the Las Vegas-area community of Paradise, Nevada, from March 2–7, 2023.

Seeds
All 10 conference teams participated in the tournament. Teams are seeded by record within the conference, with a tiebreaker system to seed teams with identical conference records. The tiebreakers operate in the following order:
 Head-to-head record
 Record against the top-seeded team not involved in the tie, going down through the standings until the tie is broken
 NET rating after the final regular-season conference games on February 25

Schedule and results

Notes 
 RSNs airing the games include Bally Sports, AT&T SportsNet, Root Sports Northwest, and MSGSN. (RSNs may not carry every game)

Bracket 

* denotes overtime period

See also 

 2023 West Coast Conference women's basketball tournament

References

West Coast Conference men's basketball tournament
2022–23 West Coast Conference men's basketball season
West Coast Conference men's basketball tournament
West Coast Conference men's basketball tournament
College sports tournaments in Nevada